Scientific philosophy may refer to:

 Logical positivism
 Experimental philosophy

For philosophical issues raised by science, see philosophy of science.